Sengoku is a beat 'em up arcade game. It is the first entry of the Sengoku trilogy by SNK. It was ported to numerous home consoles including the Neo Geo, Neo Geo CD, Mega-CD and Super Famicom. The arcade version was part of SNK Arcade Classics Vol. 1, released in 2008. The Neo Geo version was re-released on the Japanese Virtual Console in 2011, with the sequels for the North American Virtual Console on November 8, 2012 (Sengoku 2) and June 6, 2013 (Sengoku 3) and for the PAL region on February 7, 2013 (Sengoku 2) and September 5, 2013 (Sengoku 3). In 2009 the series was compiled on the Sengoku Anthology for PlayStation 2 and Windows.

Gameplay

A player has a maximum of six health points. When certain enemies are defeated, spirits of powerful forms are available to transform into. In the SNES version transformation cannot be toggled, but stays constant for a limited time. The three different forms are a samurai, an armour-clad wolf and a more agile ninja. These forms have a limited use. Their attacks and jumps differ from the original form and their powers are enhanced by any power-ups collected.

Throughout the game the player would need to survive the hordes of enemies by collecting coloured orbs as power-ups. Five Green orbs heal one health point. A Red orb gives the player a single sword, a Cyan orb gives the player a double sword, the Purple orb gives the player a two-handed holy sword and a Yellow orb gives the player a limited magical attack.

Plot
Centuries ago a cruel and insanely tyrannical warlord was defeated by the two elite Samurai but had sworn to return in the future. When he does he unleashes undead forces of feudal Japanese warriors to destroy the world and its people. The warlord is opposed only by the two protagonists, a ninja and a Western cowboy (named Ninja Dave and Cowboy Kev in the Neo-Geo version and named Dan and Bill in the SNES version), who turn out to be descendants of the two elite Samurai responsible for vanquishing the wicked warlord centuries ago.

Reception

In Japan, Game Machine listed Sengoku on their March 15, 1991 issue as being the thirteenth most-successful table arcade unit of the month. Likewise, RePlay reported Sengoku to be the fourth most-popular arcade game at the time. 

On release, Famicom Tsūshin scored the Neo Geo version of the game a 19 out of 40. Electronic Gaming Monthly gave the Super NES version a 4.4 out of 10, commenting that it "has an interesting concept as you can change into different types of fighters, yet it just doesn't come together." Power Unlimited gave the Neo Geo version a score of 85% writing: "A top-shelf brawler, even for people who aren't much of a fighter. The game gives you a real fighting feeling, thanks to the great sounds and images."

Notes

References

External links
Sengoku at GameFAQs
Sengoku at Giant Bomb

1991 video games
ACA Neo Geo games
Arcade video games
SNK beat 'em ups
Cooperative video games
Data East video games
D4 Enterprise games
Hack and slash games
Multiplayer and single-player video games
Neo Geo games
Neo Geo CD games
Video games about ninja
Nintendo Switch games
PlayStation Network games
PlayStation 4 games
Sega CD games
Side-scrolling beat 'em ups
SNK franchises
SNK Playmore games
Super Nintendo Entertainment System games
Video games about samurai
Virtual Console games
Windows games
Xbox One games
Sammy games
Video games developed in Japan
Hamster Corporation games